Lucjan is a given name of Polish origin. Notable people with the name include:

Lucjan Brychczy (born 1934), Polish football player
Lucjan Dobroszycki (1925–1995), Polish scientist and historian specializing in modern Polish and Polish-Jewish history
Lucjan Karasiewicz (born 1979), Polish politician
Lucjan Kudzia (born 1942), Polish luger who competed during the early 1960s
Lucjan Kulej (1896–1971), Polish jurist and ice hockey player
Lucjan Kydryński (1929–2006), Polish journalist and writer, radio and TV program host
Lucjan Malinowski (1839–1898), Polish linguist, traveller, professor of Jagiellonian University
Lucjan Rydel (1870–1918), Polish playwright and poet from the Young Poland movement
Lucjan Siemieński (1807–1877), Polish Romantic poet, prose writer, and literary critic
Lucjan Wolanowski (1920–2006), Polish journalist, writer and traveller
Lucjan Zarzecki (1873–1925), Polish pedagogue and mathematician
Lucjan Żeligowski (1865–1947), Polish general, and veteran of World War I, the Polish-Soviet War and World War II

Polish masculine given names